Yasmine Kabbaj (born 15 January 2004) is a Moroccan tennis player.

Kabbaj made her WTA Tour main-draw debut at the 2022 Morocco Open, where she received entry into the wildcard into the doubles draw partnering Ekaterina Kazionova.

Kabbaj won her first senior title on the ITF Circuit at the $15K Casablanca in July 2022.

College tennis
İn 2021, she has played for the Florida International University women's tennis team.

ITF Finals

Singles: 1 (1 title)

References

External links
 
 

2004 births
Living people
Moroccan female tennis players
Moroccan expatriates in the United States
FIU Panthers women's tennis players
People from Fez, Morocco
21st-century Moroccan women